Lockhart is a surname of Scottish origin.

People with the surname
Anne Lockhart (actress) (born 1953), US actress
Beatriz Lockhart (1944–2015), Uruguayan pianist, music educator and composer
Calvin Lockhart (1934–2007), Bahamian–American actor
Carla Lockhart (born 1985), British Member of Parliament
Charles Lockhart (disambiguation), various people
Chekira Lockhart Hypolite, Dominican politician
Dennis P. Lockhart (born 1947), US businessman and president of Atlanta Federal Reserve since 2007
E. Lockhart (born 1967), pen name for American writer Emily Jenkins
Eugenia Lockhart (fl. 1908–1960), Bahamian suffragette
Frank P. Lockhart, (1881–1949), US diplomat
Frank Lockhart (1903–1928), American automobile racing driver
Gene Lockhart (1891–1957), Canadian character actor, singer and popular composer
George Claude Lockhart (1885–1979), British circus ringmaster
George William Lockhart (1849–1904), British elephant trainer
Grace Annie Lockhart (1855–1916), the first woman in the British Empire to receive a bachelor's degree
Hayden Lockhart (born 1938), the first American Air Force pilot to be shot down over North Vietnam, held as a prisoner of war for eight years
Jackie Lockhart (born 1965), Scottish curler
James Lockhart (disambiguation), various people, including:
J. B. Lockhart (1886–1969), Scottish mathematician
James Lockhart (historian) (1933–2014), American academic and historian, specialising in colonial Latin America
James Stewart Lockhart (1858–1937), British colonial official in Hong Kong and China
Joe Lockhart (born 1959), US political aide
John Gibson Lockhart (1794–1854), Scottish writer and editor
June Lockhart (born 1925), US actress
Kathleen Lockhart (1894–1978), English stage actress
Keith Lockhart (born 1959), American conductor
Keith Lockhart (baseball) (born 1964), American baseball player
Michael Lee Lockhart (1960–1997), American serial killer
Norman Lockhart (footballer) (1924-1993), Northern Irish footballer
Paul Lockhart (born 1956), NASA astronaut
Paul D. Lockhart (born 1963), American historian
R. H. Bruce Lockhart (1887–1970), journalist, author, secret agent, British diplomat and footballer
General Sir Rob Lockhart (1893–1981), British general and Scouting notable
Samuel Lockhart (1851–1933), British elephant trainer
Sean Paul Lockhart (born 1986), American actor
Seán Marty Lockhart (born 1976), Northern Irish Gaelic footballer
Thomas Lockhart (MP) (1739–1775), Scottish lawyer and politician
Thomas Lockhart (1935–2018), American politician, Republican member of the Wyoming House of Representatives since 2001
Tommy Lockhart (1892–1979), American ice hockey administrator, founder of USA Hockey
William Lockhart (disambiguation), various people
William Ewart Lockhart (1846–1900), Scottish Victorian painter
Clan Lockhart, a Lowland Scottish clan
Lockharts of Lee
Count James Lockhart (Scottish aristocrat) of Lee and Carnwath, Count Lockhart-Wisheart of the Holy Roman Empire
Sir Simon Lockhart (1300–1371), crusader knight and discoverer of the "Lee Penny"
Sir William Lockhart of Lee (1621–1675), Oliver Cromwell's ambassador at Paris
Sir George Lockhart (politician) of Lee (1673–1731), Scottish writer and politician
Sir William Lockhart of Tarbrax
Anne Lockhart of Tarbrax
Anne Lockhart, Countess of Aberdeen
George Lockhart of Tarbrax

Fictional characters
Abby Lockhart in ER
Gilderoy Lockhart in Harry Potter and the Chamber of Secrets
Bonnie Lockhart, Patrick Lockhart, Mimi Lockhart, and Conner Lockhart in Days of Our Lives
Skye Lockhart Newman from The Young and the Restless 
Sally Lockhart in books by Philip Pullman
Detective Chief Superintendent Tom Lockhart in the television series No Hiding Place
Tifa Lockhart in the video game Final Fantasy VII
Diane Lockhart in the television series The Good Wife
 Richard "Dickie" Lockhart in Carl Hiaasen's 1987 novel Double Whammy

See also
 Lockhart (disambiguation)
 Lockheart

Surnames of Lowland Scottish origin